The 1961 Belgian Grand Prix was a Formula One motor race held on 18 June 1961 at Spa-Francorchamps. It was race 3 of 8 in both the 1961 World Championship of Drivers and the 1961 International Cup for Formula One Manufacturers.

The organizers of the race invited 25 entries, but were only going to pay starting money to 19: sixteen pre-selected cars plus the 3 fastest of the remaining 9. Three of the cars without starting money decided not to race after practicing. A fourth entry was a single car for Cliff Allison and Henry Taylor. UDT Laystall decided to let the fastest driver in practice compete, but Allison wrecked the car on his first practice lap. The Emeryson cars were also discarded by Equipe Nationale Belge after discovering terminal chassis damage on one of them, although Willy Mairesse gained the use of a Team Lotus spare machine to post a better time on Saturday. The team eventually reached a deal for Mairesse and Lucien Bianchi to compete in the race with the older, yet proven, Lotus 18s of non-starters Marsh and Seidel. 

The race was completely dominated by the Ferrari team, with the four works drivers finishing 1-2-3-4. This was the last time any constructor achieved this score in a F1 race. Of the four works Ferraris, three cars were painted red in the tradition of rosso corsa, the national racing colour of Italy, and Gendebien's car was painted in a Belgian racing yellow. Apart from two NART entries in the  season this was the last time a Ferrari car wore other than the traditional red colour in Formula One. While Graham Hill took the lead at the start from sixth on the grid, he could not hold off the Italian cars and all had passed him by the end of the first lap. Hill fought with John Surtees for fifth place until he retired with an oil leak on the 24th lap.

Classification

Qualifying 

 Drivers that were not guaranteed full starting money: only the top 3 non-guaranteed drivers would receive it. Despite this, Godin de Beaufort and Bandini chose to compete anyway.

Race

Championship standings after the race

Drivers' Championship standings

Constructors' Championship standings

 Notes: Only the top five positions are included for both sets of standings.

References

Belgian Grand Prix
Belgian Grand Prix
Grand Prix